The 2nd (African) Division was a British Empire colonial unit that fought during the Second World War. On 19 July 1940, the 2nd (African) Division was formed in Kenya, British East Africa. On 24 November of that year, the division was redesignated as the British Army's 12th (African) Division. The 12th (African) Division was also known as the 12th (East African) Division when in October 1941 its West African brigade from the Gold Coast was reassigned and replaced with a third East African brigade. The division was disbanded in East Africa on 18 April 1943.

Background
In 1938, the King's African Rifles (KAR) in Kenya had been composed of two brigade-strength units organized as a Northern Brigade and a Southern Brigade. The combined strength of both units amounted to 94 officers, 60 non-commissioned officers, and 2,821 African other ranks. After the outbreak of war, these units provided the trained nucleus for the rapid expansion of the KAR.

By March 1940, the strength of the KAR had reached 883 officers, 1,374 non-commissioned officers, and 20,026 African other ranks. The size of a KAR battalion was established at 36 officers, 44 non-commissioned officers and other ranks, and 1,050 African other ranks.

Initially the KAR deployed as the 1st East African Infantry Brigade and the 2nd East African Infantry Brigade. The first brigade was responsible for coastal defense and the second was responsible for the defense of the interior.

By the end of July, two additional East African brigades were formed, the 3rd East African Infantry Brigade and the 6th East African Infantry Brigade. Initially a Coastal Division and a Northern Frontier District Division were planned. But, instead, on 19 July, the 1st (African) Division and the 2nd (African) Division were formed. On 24 November, these divisions became the 11th African Division and the 12th African Division.

By July 1940, under the terms of a war contingency plan, the Royal West African Frontier Force provided two brigades for service in Kenya. One brigade was from the Gold Coast (Ghana) and one brigade was from Nigeria. The Nigerian brigade, together with two East African brigades (KAR brigades) and some South Africans, formed 11th African Division. The 12th African Division had a similar formation with a Ghanaian brigade taking the place of a Nigerian brigade.

History
The 12th African Division was one of the three divisions under Lieutenant-General Alan Cunningham in Kenya. During the East African Campaign, the 12th African Division attacked from Kenya into Italian Somaliland and then advanced into Ethiopia.

Order of battle

On formation
On formation as 2nd (African) Division 19 July to 24 November 1940. The division was renamed as the 12th (African) Division on 18 October 1940.

2nd (East Africa) Infantry Brigade
1st Battalion, King's African Rifles (as the 1/1st battalion after 17 October 1940)
5th Battalion, King's African Rifles
6th Battalion, King's African Rifles (as the 1/6th battalion after 17 October 1940)

Renamed the 22nd (East Africa) Infantry Brigade on 18 October 1940

4th (Gold Coast) Infantry Brigade
1st Battalion, Gold Coast Regiment
2nd Battalion, Gold Coast Regiment
3rd Battalion, Gold Coast Regiment

Renamed the 24th (Gold Coast) Infantry Brigade on 18 October 1940.

Artillery
1st (Gold Coast) Light Battery, West African Artillery
22nd Indian Mountain Battery

The 1st (Gold Coast) Light Battery was renamed the 51st (Gold Coast) Light Battery on 18 October 1940.

Engineers
1st (East Africa) Field Company, East African Engineers
2nd (Gold Coast) Field Company, West African Engineers

Renamed the 54th (East Africa) Field Company, East African Engineers and 52nd (Gold Coast) Field Company, West African Engineers respectively on 18 October 1940.

Division troops
2nd (African) Division Signals

Renamed the 12th (African) Division Signals on 18 October 1940.

As 12th (African) Division
As the 12th (African) Division in East Africa and, from 10 February to 6 April 1941, Italian Somaliland, fighting in the Juba in February 1941.

22nd (East Africa) Infantry Brigade (left 12 December 1940, rejoined 6 January 1941, left 23 February, rejoined 2 March 1941, left 11 March, swapping with 11th (African) Division)
1/1st Battalion, King's African Rifles
5th Battalion, King's African Rifles
1/6th Battalion, King's African Rifles

24th (Gold Coast) Infantry Brigade
1st Battalion, Gold Coast Regiment
2nd Battalion, Gold Coast Regiment
3rd Battalion, Gold Coast Regiment

Artillery
51st (Gold Coast) Light Battery, West African Artillery
53rd (East Africa )Light Battery, East African Artillery
22nd Indian Mountain Battery (left 2 December 1940, rejoined 8 January to 22 February 1941)

Engineers
52nd (Gold Coast) Field Company, West African Engineers
54th (East Africa) Field Company, East African Engineers (left 2 December 1940, rejoined 8 January to 23 February 1941)
53rd (Gold Coast) Field Company, West African Engineers (joined 23 to 27 February 1941)

Division troops
12th (African) Division Signals

Abyssinia and after
From the division's deployment to Abyssinia to its disbanding on 17 April 1943, fighting at Gondar in October and November 1941.

22nd (East Africa) Infantry Brigade (rejoined 27 July 1941 left 22 December 1941)
1/1st Battalion, King's African Rifles
5th Battalion, King's African Rifles
1/6th Battalion, King's African Rifles

24th (Gold Coast) Infantry Brigade (left 11 October 1941)
1st Battalion, Gold Coast Regiment
2nd Battalion, Gold Coast Regiment
3rd Battalion, Gold Coast Regiment

25th (East Africa) Infantry Brigade (from 7 April to 13 July 1941: from 19 September 1941 to 12 March 1942)
2/3rd  Battalion, King's African Rifles
2/4th Battalion, King's African Rifles
3/4th Battalion, King's African Rifles (from 18 June)
6th (Uganda) Field Ambulance

26th (East Africa) Infantry Brigade (from 20 October 1941 to 18 December 1942)
2/2nd Battalion, King's African Rifles
4/4th Battalion, King's African Rifles
3/6th Battalion, King's African Rifles 

28th (East Africa) Infantry Brigade (from 8 March 1942)
4/6th Battalion, King's African Rifles
2/1st Battalion, King's African Rifles
7th Battalion, King's African Rifles
28th (East Africa) Infantry Brigade Group Company East African Army Service Corps (from 1 January 1942)
8th (East Africa) Field Ambulance (from 18 March 1943)

29th (East Africa) Infantry Brigade (from 21 January 1943)
2/4th Battalion, King's African Rifles
5/6th Battalion, King's African Rifles
5th Battalion Northern Rhodesia Regiment
29th (East Africa) Infantry Brigade Group Company East African Army Service Corps

Artillery
51st (Gold Coast) Light Battery, West African Artillery (left 6 December 1941)
53rd (East Africa )Light Battery, East African Artillery (from 7 April to 13 July 1941; from 13 August to 7 December 1941)
22nd Indian Mountain Battery (from 27 July to 5 December 1941)
18th Indian Mountain Battery (from 27 July to 11 August 1941; from 9 October to 5 December 1941)

Engineers
52nd (Gold Coast) Field Company, West African Engineers (left 11 October 1941)
54th (East Africa) Field Company, East African Engineers (from 27 July 1941)
53rd (Gold Coast) Field Company, West African Engineers (from 7 April to 6 December 1941)

Division troops
12th (African) Division Signals (left 21 February 1943)

Commanding officers
 Major-General Alfred Reade Godwin-Austen 1940–1941
 Major-General Charles Christopher Fowkes 1941–1943

See also 
 East African Campaign (World War II)
 1st (African) Division (United Kingdom)
 Order of Battle, East African Campaign (World War II)
 Nigel Gray Leakey

References

External links
 British Military History - East Africa 1940 - 47

02
02
02
02
02
Military units and formations established in 1940
Military units and formations disestablished in 1941